The Baret Mountains (Baret Montes) is a chain of mountains on the surface of the dwarf planet Pluto. It is located near the west border of Sputnik Planitia in the Tombaugh Regio. These mountains were first viewed by the New Horizons spacecraft. It features large ridges that are formed by the compression of methane and water ice.

Naming 
The mountains are named after Jeanne Baret, a French explorer and first woman to have completed a circumnavigation voyage of the globe. The New Horizons team suggested this name in 2015, and it was officially approved by the International Astronomical Union in April 2018.

Gallery

References

See also

 Geography of Pluto
 Geology of Pluto
 List of geological features on Pluto

Surface features of Pluto
Geography of Pluto
Extraterrestrial mountains